Kutama College (officially St Francis Xavier College) is a private Catholic independent boarding high school near Norton, Zimbabwe in the Zvimba area, 80 kilometres southwest of Harare. Grown out of a Mission station founded in 1914 and run by the Marist Brothers, Kutama has a student population of about 700 pupils.

Kutama College is one of the largest top schools in Zimbabwe. Kutama College was ranked 26th out of the top 100 best high schools in Africa by Africa Almanac in 2017, based on quality of education, student engagement, strength and activities of alumni, school profile, internet and news visibility.

Kutama offers a rich educational curriculum and offers both ZIMSEC, HEXCO & Cambridge examinations. The school is popular for its academic prowess in Africa. In addition to splendid academics, the school has state of the art sporting facilities to cater for sports like athletics, basketball, cricket, volleyball, handball, hockey, beach volleyball, golf, tennis , table tennis, badminton, rugby, darts and several others.

The school moto "Esse Quam Videri" is Latin meaning "to be, rather than to seem".

History
Founded prior to the Second World War by English Jesuit Priests at the request of Bishop Aston Chichester, Kutama was one of the first institutions to offer high school education to students of African descent in colonial Rhodesia. Its Jesuit origins are reflected in its official name, St Francis Xavier College. The school is part of Kutama Mission, a Catholic mission originally run by Jesuits but now run by the Marist Brothers, a Catholic order devoted to educational work.

The school's first headmaster was Father Jerome O'Hea, an Irish-born priest after whom the local mission hospital is named. Its most famous headmaster was James Anthony (affectionately known as "Jachi") Chinamasa, a Kutama College Old Boy(KOBA) and elder brother of Zimbabwean Justice Minister Patrick Chinamasa. The current headmaster is Mr Francis Mukoyi who took over from Br Jacob Mutingwende.

Houses
Like most high schools in Zimbabwe, which follow the traditional British school system, students at Kutama are divided into four houses each having its own colour: 
 Champagnat (Blue), named after the Saint Marcellin Champagnat, the founder of the Marist movement.
 Chichester (Red)
 Michael (Green)
 Patrick (Yellow)

Notable alumni

  – Zimbabwe's second finance minister (1982–1995)
 
  – former Minister without portfolio

See also
 List of schools in Zimbabwe
 List of boarding schools
 List of Marist Brothers schools
 Association of Trust Schools

References

External links
 
 Top 100 African Schools

High schools in Zimbabwe
Private schools in Zimbabwe
Boarding schools in Zimbabwe
Boys' schools in Zimbabwe
Boys' high schools in Zimbabwe
Marist Brothers schools
Marist Brothers schools in Zimbabwe
Catholic schools in Zimbabwe
Catholic secondary schools in Zimbabwe